Orenia sivashensis is an anaerobe and thermophilic bacterium from the genus of Orenia which has been isolated from the hypersaline lagoon of the Lake Sivash in Crimea.

References

Clostridia
Bacteria described in 2000